is a Japanese professional baseball player. He was born on August 11, 1993. He debuted in 2013 for the Hokkaido Nippon-Ham Fighters. Of the five at-bats in his rookie season, none were successful hits.

Matsumoto was a member of the 2006 Little League World Series team from Japan which ultimately lost the world championship to the team from Columbus, Georgia.

References

Living people
1993 births
Baseball people from Saitama Prefecture
Japanese baseball players
Nippon Professional Baseball infielders
Nippon Professional Baseball outfielders
Hokkaido Nippon-Ham Fighters players